The 1904 NYU Violets football team was an American football team that represented New York University as an independent during the 1904 college football season. In their only year under head coach Dave Fultz, the team compiled a 3–6 record.

Schedule

References

NYU
NYU Violets football seasons
NYU Violets football